L'aube à l'envers is a 1995 French short film written and directed by Sophie Marceau and starring Judith Godrèche, Jerzy Gralek, and Anna Nehrebecka. It was screened in the Un Certain Regard section at the 1995 Cannes Film Festival.

Plot
A young woman comes home to a half-empty apartment, and she feels alone. An older man walks through the corridors of a half-empty airport, and he feels alone and sad. He takes a photograph out of his wallet, tears it in two and drops it on the moving walkway. Both are torn in two. A girl in Paris is alone with a cat. A man arrives in Warsaw, and a woman is there to meet him. She drives him to his parents’ home. An accident, a murder—nothing alters the imperturbable course of life.

Cast
 Judith Godrèche
 Jerzy Gralek
 Anna Nehrebecka
 Pawel Burczyk
 Maciej Maciejewski
 Danuta Szaflarska

References

External links

1995 short films
1995 films
French short films
1990s French-language films
Films directed by Sophie Marceau
1990s French films